Remains is a five-issue comic book limited series published by IDW Publishing in 2004. The story is written by Steve Niles and has art by Kieron Dwyer.

Remains is about a post-apocalyptic world overrun with flesh-eating zombies.

Characters
Tom Bennett
Tori
Colonel Glenn Ramsey
Cindy Ramsey
Spaulding
Flo

Plot 
On an invitation from president Shirley Wallace, every leading nations of the world came to an agreement of complete disarmament. But when a VIP guest's meddling son named Spaulding sneaks into the nuclear oven of Nevada and pressed a button he wasn't supposed to, humanity is literally doomed. The radiation turned the entire populace within the blast-radius into flesh-eating zombies.

During the meltdown, outside Nevada, in Reno, Silver Star Hotel and Casino's Blackjack dealer Tom Bennett was busy screwing waitress Tori inside the vault. They came out with the realization that they are the only remaining persons that haven't been turned into zombies. But as their life in a post-apocalyptic period goes on, they realize they have even bigger threats to worry about.

Collected editions
Remains was published as a trade paperback by IDW Publishing, .

Film adaptation
The comic book has been optioned to be a made into a television film that would appear on the Chiller television network.

Filming on Steve Niles' Remains wrapped in June 2011 and the film premiered on Chiller on December 6, 2011.

Awards
2005: Keiron Dwyer was nominated for the "Best Cover Artist" Eisner Award, for his Remains covers

See also
List of zombie novels

Notes

References

External links

 
'Remains' at the Comics Dune

Comics by Steve Niles